Brooke Van Poppelen (born 1978) is an American comedian, actress, and writer. She co-hosted the truTV series Hack My Life. Van Poppelen is from Detroit, Michigan. Prior to working in New York City and Los Angeles, she performed and trained in Chicago.

Discography

Comedy albums
 Hard Feelings (2016)

References

External links
 

1978 births
Living people
American actresses
American women comedians
American women writers
People from Detroit
21st-century American comedians
21st-century American women